Hamad Mahmood Ismaeel Ali Mohamed Al-Shamsan (born 29 September 1997) is a Bahraini footballer who plays as a defender for Al-Riffa and the Bahrain national team.

Career
Al-Shamsan was included in Bahrain's squad for the 2019 AFC Asian Cup in the United Arab Emirates.

Career statistics

International

References

External links
 
 
 
 
 Hamad Al-Shamsan at WorldFootball.com

1997 births
Living people
Sportspeople from Manama
Bahraini footballers
Bahrain international footballers
Association football defenders
Riffa SC players
Bahraini Premier League players
Footballers at the 2018 Asian Games
Asian Games competitors for Bahrain
2019 AFC Asian Cup players
Bahrain youth international footballers